A sacerdotal state is a state whose head is also an ecclesiastical leader designated by a religious body. An example of this kind of state is the Vatican City, whose head of state is the pope of the Catholic Church since the eighth century. Andorra operates under a semi-sacerdotal system, as one of its co-heads of state is the bishop of Urgell, while the other is the president of France. However unlike the Vatican, the co-princes of Andorra are not closely involved in the government.

In the past it was common for bishops to assume civil as well as clerical power and rule as prince-bishops. This was common in the Holy Roman Empire, where three of the seven imperial electors were prince-archbishops (Trier, Mainz and Cologne). After the Peace of Westphalia certain prince-bishoprics became bi-confessional and alternated between Catholic bishops and Protestant administrators.

Current Sacerdotal States 
The following are sacerdotal or partly sacerdotal  states:

Andorra 
Andorra operates under a semi-sacerdotal system, as one of its co-heads of state is the bishop of Urgell, while the other is the president of France, however the co-princes of Andorra are not closely involved in the government. The Bishop of Urgell is one of the two Catholic religious figures that also lead a country, the other being the Pope of Vatican City. Like other bishops, the Bishop of Urgell is also appointed by the Pope thus the pope appoints a fellow head of state.

Iran 
The Supreme Leader of Iran is elected for life by a body consisting of senior Twelver clerics. The supreme leader, known as an ayatollah, is the spiritual leader of the country as well as a powerful political figure with wide-ranging powers and his own military force.

United Kingdom 
Since the English Reformation, English and British monarchs have held the title supreme governor of the Church of England, signifying leadership of the state church. The subsequent personal and legal unions with Wales, Scotland and Ireland did not extend Anglicanism's status of state church to these lands. Thus in the United Kingdom, the monarch is the head of state and also the leader of the state church in England and its Crown dependencies.

Vatican City 
Vatican City's head of state since the eighth century is the pope of the Catholic Church. The pope is one of the two Catholic religious figures that also lead a country, the other being the Bishop of Urgell of Andorra.

Former Sacerdotal States 
The following are states that were sacerdotal or partly sacerdotal:

Montenegro 
Prince-Bishopric of Montenegro was an Eastern Orthodox ecclesiastical principality that existed from 1516 until 1852 in the Balkans during the Ottoman Empire's rule over the most of the region.

Tibet 
In the past, Tibet was ruled by the Dalai Lamas, political leaders who were symbolic religious leaders but had no formal position in religious organisations, so not being sacerdotal.

References

Christianity and politics
Political geography
Theocracy